The Pittsfield Electrics were an American minor league baseball club located in Pittsfield, Massachusetts. They joined the Eastern Association, a now defunct minor professional baseball league, in 1913, and finished in 7th place that first year with a record of 62 wins and 73 losses. Pittsfield's W.I. Smith led the EA with 175 strikeouts. After the 1914 season, the team finished in 6th place with a record of 60 wins and 63 losses, the Eastern Association folded. Robert Troy led the EA with 212 strikeouts.

The Electrics played their home games at Wahconah Park.

Future Major League Electrics
Lew Wendell (1913)
Pat Parker (1914)
Otto Rettig (1914)

Electrics with previous Major League experience
Art Nichols (1913)
Jock Somerlott (1913-1914)
Polly Wolfe (1913-1914)
Bun Troy (1914)
Frank Nicholson (1914)

References

1913 establishments in Massachusetts
1914 disestablishments in Massachusetts
Baseball teams established in 1913
Baseball teams disestablished in 1914
Defunct baseball teams in Massachusetts
Defunct minor league baseball teams
Baseball teams in Pittsfield, Massachusetts
Professional baseball teams in Massachusetts
Connecticut League teams